Catopta kansuensis is a moth in the family Cossidae. It was described by Felix Bryk in 1942. It is found in the Chinese provinces of Gansu and Qinghai.

References

Moths described in 1942
Catoptinae